East Duke is a town in Jackson County, Oklahoma, United States.  The population was 424 at the 2010 census.

Geography
East Duke is located at  (34.662959, -99.569631).

Demographics

As of the census of 2010, there were 424 people living in the town. There were 201 housing units at an average density of 459 per square mile (179/km2). The racial makeup of the town was 88.31% White, 0.22% African American, 0.67% Native American, 0.90% Asian, 5.17% from other races, and 4.72% from two or more races. Hispanic or Latino of any race were 9.44% of the population.

There were 172 households, out of which 36.2% had children under the age of 18 living with them, 66.1% were married couples living together, 8.0% had a female householder with no husband present, and 24.7% were non-families. 20.7% of all households were made up of individuals, and 11.5% had someone living alone who was 65 years of age or older. The average household size was 2.56 and the average family size was 2.98.

In the town, the population was spread out, with 28.1% under the age of 18, 7.4% from 18 to 24, 29.7% from 25 to 44, 21.3% from 45 to 64, and 13.5% who were 65 years of age or older. The median age was 35 years. For every 100 females, there were 104.1 males. For every 100 females age 18 and over, there were 89.3 males.

The median income for a household in the town was $33,942, and the median income for a family was $39,063. Males had a median income of $30,673 versus $16,875 for females. The per capita income for the town was $16,739. About 4.7% of families and 8.5% of the population were below the poverty line, including 12.7% of those under age 18 and 9.4% of those age 65 or over.

References

External links
 The Town of East Duke: "The Tale of Two Cities"
 Encyclopedia of Oklahoma History and Culture - Duke

Notable people
Logan Harrod

Towns in Jackson County, Oklahoma
Towns in Oklahoma